This is a list of notable alumni and staff of Birmingham City University, in Birmingham, England, and its predecessor institutions:

Anstey College of Physical Education
Birmingham and Solihull College of Nursing and Midwifery
Birmingham College of Commerce
Birmingham School of Acting
Birmingham School of Art
Birmingham School of Jewellery
Bordesley College of Education
Bournville College of Art (now the Bournville Centre for Visual Arts)
Birmingham School of Music (now Birmingham Conservatoire)
City of Birmingham College of Education
Defence School of Health Care Studies
North Birmingham Technical College
South Birmingham Technical College
West Midlands School of Radiography

Staff
Mark Addis
Chris Baines — environmentalist
Charles Bateman — architect
William Bidlake
William Bloye
Jonathan Bowen — computer scientist
Paul Bradshaw — journalist
John Bridgeman — sculptor
Paul Clarkson
Benjamin Creswick
Trevor Denning
Elizabeth Fradd
Arthur Gaskin
Bruce George
Charles March Gere
Bruce Grocott, Baron Grocott
Albert Herbert
Islam Issa
Zhiming Liu — computer scientist
Sylvani Merilion
Sidney Meteyard
Nicola Monaghan
David Prentice
Roy Priest — musician (formerly of Sweet Jesus)
Marius Romme
Jeffrey Skidmore
Edward R. Taylor
Philip Tew
George Wallis
 Elizabeth Yardley - criminologist
David Wilson — criminologist
Pete Wilson — bass guitarist
Simon M. Woods

Alumni

Armed forces
Harry Price — Royal Navy seaman

Art and design
Martin Aitchison
Maxwell Armfield
Grace Barnsley
Alfred Bestall
Stephen Biesty
Richard Billingham — photographer
William Bloye
Emmy Bridgwater
Gerald Brockhurst
Herbert Tudor Buckland
Kate Bunce
Edward Burne-Jones
Joseph Finnemore
Arthur Gaskin (also staff)
Georgie Gaskin
Frederick Gibberd
Bunny Guinness
William Haywood —architect
Roger Hiorns — artist
Robert Furneaux Jordan
Edwin Harris
William Alexander Harvey
Gordon Herickx
Robert van 't Hoff
Alex Hughes — Tribune cartoonist
Betty Jackson — fashion designer
David McFall
Danie Mellor
Oscar Mellor
Sidney Meteyard (also staff)
H. R. Millar
William Jabez Muckley
Edmund Hort New
Dorrie Nossiter
Hugh O'Donnell — artist
Henry Payne — artist
Peter Phillips — artist
George Phoenix
John Poole — sculptor
Donald Rodney — artist
Henry Rushbury
John Salt
John Shelley — illustrator
Percy Shakespeare
Bernard Sleigh
Joseph Southall
Marty St. James — video artist
David Tremlett
Ian Walters
Harry Weedon
Robert Welch — designer
Phil Winslade
Graham Winteringham
A. H. Woodfull
John Skirrow Wright
Tang Da Wu

Media
Smitthi Bhiraleus
Marverine Cole — broadcast journalist
Kirsten O'Brien — children's television presenter
Fiona Phillips – TV presenter 
Mary Rhodes — sports TV presenter
Bob Rickard
Charlie Stayt — BBC newsreader
Margherita Taylor — radio and TV presenter

Medicine and science
Bethann Siviter — nurse-author
Kevin Warwick — scientist

Performing arts
Carole Boyd
James Bradshaw — actor (of the Birmingham School of Acting)
Anna Brewster
Krzysztof Czerwiński
Nick Duffy — musician
Stephen Duffy — singer-songwriter
Jeremy Filsell
Nicholas Gledhill
Ainsley Howard
Barbara Keogh
Tom Lister
Luke Mably
Jimi Mistry — actor (of the Birmingham School of Acting)
Horace Panter
Rhydian Roberts — singer and The X Factor contestant
John Taylor — bass guitarist, founder of Duran Duran
Jack Rubinacci
Jinny Sandhú  — professional wrestler
Frank Skinner — comedian
Catherine Tyldesley
William Villiers, 10th Earl of Jersey
Nicol Williamson — actor (of the Birmingham School of Acting)
Marjorie Yates — actress

Politics
Paul Goggins
Lynne Jones — politician, former MP for Selly Oak
Khalid Mahmood — politician, MP for Perry Barr
Gloria De Piero
David Hallam MEP

Writing
Jim Crace — novelist
Charles Wood — playwright

Honours award holders
Victor Adebowale, Baron Adebowale
Laurie Baker
Stephen Bright
Digby Jones, Baron Jones of Birmingham
Andy Hamilton — saxophonist
Karl Johnson
David Nicholson — civil servant
T. R. Pachamuthu
Jenny Uglow
Gillian Weir
Benjamin Zephaniah

References

People
Birmingham City University